Lora Johnson is an American author best known for the novel Ice.

Her works include numerous original novels and Star Trek reference books including Mr. Scott's Guide to the Enterprise, the Star Trek: The Next Generation Technical Journal and Worlds of the Federation. She also authored the Star Wars Technical Journal and contributed to the canon of the Star Wars universe. She is an historian of US spaceflights and was a design consultant on HBO's From the Earth to the Moon mini-series. More recently, she created the Virtual Alamo interactive online exhibit for the University of Texas at Arlington.

Gender transition
After suffering prolonged and debilitating stress-induced health problems that nearly ended her life, Johnson dropped out of the public eye in 2008 and underwent correction of a congenital intersex condition, transitioning from male to female.

Awards
Her novel Chayatocha received the Best of 2003 in literature award from Christian Fiction Review magazine. Two of her novels, Ice and The Last Guardian, were Christy Award finalists.

Partial bibliography

References

Christian novelists
21st-century American novelists
American science fiction writers
Living people
Year of birth missing (living people)